Hufrish Nariman is a  former badminton player. She was the bronze medalist in badminton at the 1982 Asian Games in the Women's Team event.She is a coach in the Prakash Padukone Badminton Academy.

References

Living people
Indian female badminton players
Badminton players at the 1982 Asian Games
Asian Games bronze medalists for India
Asian Games medalists in badminton
Medalists at the 1982 Asian Games
Parsi people
Year of birth missing (living people)
20th-century Indian women